Neufchâtel may refer to:

Places 
  Neuchâtel, city in Switzerland, formerly spelled Neufchâtel
  Canton of Neuchâtel, whose capital is the city
  Neuchâtel (district), within the canton, contains the city
  Lake Neuchâtel, with the city on its shore
  Neufchâtel-Hardelot, a municipality in Nord-Pas-de-Calais, France
  Neufchâtel-sur-Aisne, a municipality in Picardy, France
  Neufchâtel-en-Bray, a municipality in Normandy, France
  Neuchâtel-Urtière, a commune in Bourgogne-Franche-Comté, France
  Neufchâtel, Quebec, a place in Quebec

Others 
Neufchâtel cheese, a Normandy cheese
Nicolas Neufchatel (ca. 1527 – ca. 1590), Flemish artist

See also 
 Neufchâteau (disambiguation)